NGC 1049 is a globular cluster located in the  Local Group galaxy of the Fornax Dwarf, visible in the constellation of Fornax.  At a distance of 630,000 light years, it is  visible in moderate sized telescopes, while the parent galaxy is nearly invisible.  This globular cluster was discovered by John Herschel on October 19, 1835, while the parent galaxy was discovered in 1938 by Harlow Shapley.

References

External links
 
 

Globular clusters
1049
Fornax (constellation)
Milky Way Subgroup